Rumenic acid, also known as bovinic acid, is a conjugated linoleic acid (CLA) found in the fat of ruminants and in dairy products.  It is an omega-7 trans fatty acid. Its lipid shorthand name is cis-9, trans-11 18:2 acid. The name was proposed by Kramer et al. in 1998.  It can be considered as the principal dietary form, accounting for as much as 85-90% of the total CLA content in dairy products.

Biosynthesis and biotransformations
Rumenic acid is produced from vaccenic acid by the action of unsaturase enzymes.  Rumenic acid is converted back to vaccenic acid en route to stearic acid

Further reading

References

Fatty acids
Alkenoic acids